These genera belong to Stenochiinae, a subfamily of darkling beetles in the family Tenebrionidae.

Stenochiinae genera

 Acanthobas Gebien, 1928  (the Neotropics)
 Acanthocamaria Gebien, 1919  (the Neotropics)
 Achariotheca Kaszab, 1970  (Australasia)
 Achrostus Fairmaire, 1891  (tropical Africa)
 Actanorie Bates, 1879  (tropical Africa)
 Aesthetus C.O. Waterhouse, 1890  (the Neotropics)
 Agissopterus Fairmaire, 1884  (the Neotropics)
 Agymnonyx Gebien, 1921  (Australasia)
 Ahexaroptrum Kaszab, 1960  (Indomalaya)
 Ainu Lewis, 1894  (the Palearctic and Indomalaya)
 Alcyonotus Pascoe, 1882  (tropical Africa)
 Alobates Motschulsky, 1872  (North America)
 Amarsenes Bates, 1879  (tropical Africa)
 Amenophis J. Thomson, 1858  (tropical Africa)
 Anachayus Bouchard & Bousquet, 2021  (tropical Africa)
 Andocamaria Masumoto, 1993  (Indomalaya)
 Androsus Gebien, 1921  (Indomalaya and Australasia)
 Anisophaedis Ando, 1993  (Indomalaya)
 Annamosdara Kaszab, 1941  (Indomalaya)
 Apsida Lacordaire, 1859  (North America and the Neotropics)
 Aptereucyrtus Gebien, 1922  (Indomalaya)
 Apterobrachys Kaszab, 1986  (Australasia)
 Apteromaia Kulzer, 1952  (Indomalaya)
 Apteromerus Blair, 1928  (Australasia and Oceania)
 Apterophenus Gebien, 1921  (Australasia and Oceania)
 Apterotheca Gebien, 1921  (Australasia)
 Argobrachium Fairmaire, 1899  (tropical Africa)
 Argutiolana Robiche, 2001  (tropical Africa)
 Artactes Pascoe, 1868  (Indomalaya)
 Asbolodes Fairmaire, 1892  (Indomalaya)
 Asbolodomimus Pic, 1921  (Indomalaya)
 Asemogena Péringuey, 1904  (tropical Africa)
 Asididius Fairmaire, 1869  (tropical Africa)
 Asidobothris Fairmaire, 1886  (tropical Africa)
 Asopidiopsis Kaszab, 1955  (Oceania)
 Asopis Haag-Rutenberg, 1878  (Oceania)
 Astathmetus Bates, 1874  (the Neotropics)
 Augolesthus Motschulsky, 1872  (Indomalaya)
 Azonoderus Harold, 1879  (tropical Africa)
 Baratus Fairmaire, 1897  (Indomalaya)
 Becvarius Masumoto, 1998  (Indomalaya)
 Bionesus Fairmaire, 1879  (Oceania)
 Biroum Kaszab, 1956  (Indomalaya)
 Blapida Perty, 1830  (the Neotropics)
 Borneocamaria Pic, 1917  (Indomalaya)
 Borneosphaerotus Grimm, 2015  (Indomalaya)
 Borneosphena Purchart & Grimm, 2016  (Indomalaya)
 Borneosynopticus Grimm, 2015  (Indomalaya)
 Bothynocara Gebien, 1928  (the Neotropics)
 Bothynocephalus Doyen, 1988  (the Neotropics)
 Bradymerus Perroud & Montrouzier, 1865  (the Palearctic, tropical Africa, Indomalaya, Australasia, and Oceania)
 Bradysphaerotus Kaszab, 1986  (Australasia)
 Brasilius Gebien, 1928  (the Neotropics)
 Bremerianus Masumoto & Becvár, 2005  (Indomalaya)
 Brosimapsida Ferrer & Ødegaard, 2005  (the Neotropics)
 Byzacnus Pascoe, 1866  (tropical Africa)
 Calabosca Fairmaire, 1894  (Indomalaya)
 Calydonella Doyen, 1995  (the Neotropics)
 Calydoniomorpha Pic, 1917  (the Neotropics)
 Calydonis Pascoe, 1882  (the Neotropics)
 Camaria Lepeletier & Audinet-Serville, 1828  (the Neotropics)
 Camarimena Motschulsky, 1863  (Indomalaya)
 Camariocropterum Pic, 1920  (the Neotropics)
 Camariodes Fairmaire, 1869  (tropical Africa)
 Camariomorpha Pic, 1915  (Indomalaya)
 Campolene Pascoe, 1863  (Australasia)
 Campsia Lepeletier & Audinet-Serville, 1828  (the Neotropics)
 Campsiomorpha Pic, 1917  (the Palearctic and Indomalaya)
 Camptobrachys Kaszab, 1941  (Indomalaya)
 Carabelops Fairmaire, 1899  (tropical Africa)
 Caracasa Pic, 1921  (the Neotropics)
 Cataphanus Gebien, 1921  (Australasia)
 Catapiestus Perty, 1831  (Indomalaya)
 Celebesa Pic, 1921  (Australasia)
 Cephalothydemus Pic, 1923  (Indomalaya)
 Cerandrosus Gebien, 1921  (Australasia)
 Cerocamptus Gebien, 1919  (Indomalaya)
 Chaetopsia Gebien, 1925  (Indomalaya)
 Chalcocyclus Fairmaire, 1884  (tropical Africa)
 Chalcopauliana Ardoin, 1961  (tropical Africa)
 Charianus Bates, 1879  (tropical Africa)
 Chariotheca Pascoe, 1860  (Australasia and Oceania)
 Chemolanus Bates, 1879  (tropical Africa)
 Chlorocamma Bates, 1873  (Australasia)
 Choastes Champion, 1893  (the Neotropics)
 Chrysopeplus Gebien, 1942  (Australasia)
 Cibdelis Mannerheim, 1843  (North America)
 Cleomis Fairmaire, 1892  (Indomalaya)
 Cnephalura Doyen, 1988  (the Neotropics)
 Cnodalon Latreille, 1797  (the Neotropics)
 Coelocnemis Mannerheim, 1843  (North America)
 Coelometopus Solier, 1848  (the Palearctic)
 Cophodema Gebien, 1943  (the Neotropics)
 Cryptobates Fairmaire, 1882  (Indomalaya)
 Cryptobatoides Kaszab, 1941  (Indomalaya)
 Cryptobrachys Kaszab, 1941  (Indomalaya)
 Cryptostenophanes Kaszab, 1941  (Indomalaya)
 Csikiola Kaszab, 1955  (Oceania)
 Cuemus Bouchard, 2000  (Australasia)
 Cuphotes Champion, 1887  (the Neotropics)
 Cybopiestes Reitter, 1917  (the Palearctic)
 Cyclonesus Fairmaire, 1896  (Indomalaya)
 Cyrtosoma Perty, 1830  (the Neotropics)
 Cyrtotyche Pascoe, 1866  (tropical Africa)
 Cyrtotyctus Kolbe, 1897  (tropical Africa)
 Damatris Laporte, 1840  (tropical Africa)
 Danodema Gebien, 1925  (tropical Africa)
 Dauresia Ferrer, 2001  (tropical Africa)
 Dechiustes Blair, 1940  (Oceania)
 Dentatoploedipus Kaszab, 1984  (Indomalaya)
 Deplanchesia Fauvel, 1860  (the Neotropics)
 Derosphaerus J. Thomson, 1858  (the Palearctic, tropical Africa, Indomalaya, and Australasia)
 Diachoriops Ando, 2020  (the Palearctic, Indomalaya, Australasia, and Oceania)
 Dicyrtus Duponchel, 1844  (the Neotropics)
 Diestesoma Péringuey, 1904  (tropical Africa)
 Dinomus Brême, 1842  (the Neotropics)
 Diopethes Pascoe, 1882  (the Neotropics)
 Dioscoridemus Koch, 1970  (tropical Africa)
 Dorelogena Péringuey, 1904  (tropical Africa)
 Drocleana Bates, 1879  (tropical Africa)
 Eccoptostoma Gebien, 1913  (tropical Africa)
 Ectomopsis Fairmaire, 1905  (the Neotropics)
 Elasmocerella Strand, 1935  (the Neotropics)
 Elomosda Bates, 1870  (the Neotropics)
 Epicalla Lacordaire, 1859  (the Neotropics)
 Epiplecta Mäklin, 1867  (the Neotropics)
 Episopus Bates, 1873  (Australasia)
 Eremobatodes Gebien, 1943  (tropical Africa)
 Espites Pascoe, 1882  (Australasia)
 Eucrossoscelis Nakane, 1963  (Indomalaya)
 Eucyrtus Lacordaire, 1859  (Indomalaya)
 Euhemicera Ando, 1996  (Indomalaya)
 Euphloeus Pascoe, 1887  (Indomalaya)
 Eutelonodolinus Robiche, 2007  (tropical Africa)
 Eutelonotus Fairmaire, 1902  (tropical Africa)
 Eutherama Carter, 1914  (Australasia)
 Euthysternum Chatanay, 1915  (tropical Africa)
 Exocolena Gebien, 1914  (Indomalaya)
 Falsandrosus Kaszab, 1980  (Indomalaya)
 Falsobates Kaszab, 1941  (Indomalaya)
 Falsobrachys Kulzer, 1954  (Indomalaya)
 Falsocamaria Pic, 1917  (the Palearctic and Indomalaya)
 Falsocamariodes Ardoin, 1956  (tropical Africa)
 Falsocuphotes Pic, 1918  (the Neotropics)
 Falsodiopethes Pic, 1924  (the Neotropics)
 Falsonannocerus Pic, 1947  (tropical Africa)
 Falsonotostrongylium Kaszab, 1955  (Oceania)
 Falsoperichilus Pic, 1920  (tropical Africa)
 Falsostrongylium Pic, 1915  (the Neotropics)
 Falsozotypus Kaszab, 1980  (Indomalaya)
 Flabellostrongylium Pic, 1938  (the Neotropics)
 Foochounus Pic, 1921  (Indomalaya)
 Freudella Ardoin, 1961  (tropical Africa)
 Gaurobates Gebien, 1928  (the Neotropics)
 Gauromaia Pascoe, 1866  (Indomalaya)
 Gebienella Kaszab, 1941  (Indomalaya)
 Gebienocamaria Masumoto, 1993  (Indomalaya)
 Genateropa Bouchard & Bousquet, 2021  (tropical Africa)
 Gigantopigeus Kaszab, 1984  (Indomalaya)
 Girardocamaria Masumoto, 1993  (Indomalaya)
 Glyptotus Leconte, 1858  (North America and the Neotropics)
 Gnesis Pascoe, 1866  (Indomalaya)
 Gonespites Gebien, 1921  (Australasia)
 Gonospa Champion, 1886  (the Neotropics)
 Graptopezus Gebien, 1921  (Australasia)
 Haplandrus Leconte, 1862  (North America)
 Haporema Fairmaire, 1892  (tropical Africa)
 Hegemona Laporte, 1840  (the Neotropics)
 Heliofugus Guérin-Méneville, 1831  (the Neotropics)
 Hemicera Laporte & Brullé, 1831  (Indomalaya)
 Hemimmedia Gebien, 1928  (the Neotropics)
 Hesiodus Champion, 1885  (the Neotropics)
 Heterostrongylium Kaszab, 1977  (Australasia)
 Hexarhopalus Fairmaire, 1891  (the Palearctic and Indomalaya)
 Hicetaon Champion, 1885  (the Neotropics)
 Holobrachys Fairmaire, 1869  (tropical Africa)
 Holostrongylium Kaszab, 1977  (Indomalaya and Australasia)
 Hoploedipinus Kaszab, 1984  (Indomalaya)
 Hoploedipus Fairmaire, 1898  (Indomalaya)
 Hoplostrongylium Ardoin, 1965  (tropical Africa)
 Hyboproctus Kolbe, 1897  (tropical Africa)
 Hydissus Pascoe, 1869  (Australasia)
 Hypaulax Bates, 1868  (Australasia)
 Hyperchalca Fairmaire, 1869  (tropical Africa)
 Hypocalis Dejean, 1834  (tropical Africa)
 Hypovinsonia Ardoin, 1961  (tropical Africa)
 Ilus Champion, 1885  (the Neotropics)
 Immedia Pascoe, 1882  (the Neotropics)
 Iphthiminus Spilman, 1973  (North America and the Palearctic)
 Iphthimulus Reitter, 1920  (the Palearctic)
 Irianobates Kaszab, 1986  (Australasia)
 Isaminas Champion, 1887  (the Neotropics)
 Isicerdes Champion, 1885  (the Neotropics)
 Isopus Montrouzier, 1860  (Australasia)
 Kabakoviella Kaszab, 1980  (Indomalaya)
 Kaszaba Matthews & Doyen, 1989  (Australasia)
 Lenkous Kaszab, 1973  (the Neotropics)
 Lepidocaulinus Schawaller, Masumoto & Merkl, 2013  (Indomalaya)
 Leprocaulinus Kaszab, 1982  (Indomalaya)
 Lomocnemis Gebien, 1921  (Australasia)
 Lophocnemis Mäklin, 1867  (Indomalaya and Australasia)
 Lordodera Gebien, 1921  (tropical Africa)
 Lycidioides Ando, 2003  (Indomalaya)
 Macropachylesthus Pic, 1923  (Indomalaya)
 Macrostethus Wollaston, 1854  (the Palearctic)
 Mahena Gebien, 1922  (tropical Africa)
 Malayaplamius Masumoto, 1986  (Indomalaya)
 Malaysphena Becvár & Purchart, 2008  (Indomalaya)
 Maracia Gebien, 1919  (the Neotropics)
 Mariepskopia Schawaller, 2012  (tropical Africa)
 Mechanetes C.O. Waterhouse, 1887  (Indomalaya)
 Melobrachys Kaszab, 1960  (Indomalaya)
 Menandris Haag-Rutenberg, 1878  (Oceania)
 Menephilus Mulsant, 1854  (the Palearctic, Indomalaya, and Oceania)
 Mentes Champion, 1893  (the Neotropics)
 Merinus Leconte, 1862  (North America)
 Metisopus Bates, 1873  (Australasia and Oceania)
 Micreuphlaeus Fairmaire, 1897  (Indomalaya)
 Microbradymerus Schawaller, 1999  (Indomalaya)
 Micromenandris Kaszab, 1955  (Oceania)
 Microphenus Gebien, 1921  (Australasia)
 Microsphaerotus Pic, 1928  (Indomalaya)
 Microtocerus Pic, 1918  (the Neotropics)
 Mictopsis Fairmaire, 1899  (tropical Africa)
 Miotodera Fairmaire, 1901  (tropical Africa)
 Misolampidius Solsky, 1875  (the Palearctic and Indomalaya)
 Misolampomorphus Kaszab, 1941  (Indomalaya)
 Misolampus Latreille, 1806  (the Palearctic)
 Mitys Champion, 1885  (the Neotropics)
 Moeon Champion, 1886  (the Neotropics)
 Mophon Champion, 1886  (the Neotropics)
 Moromelas Fairmaire, 1898  (tropical Africa)
 Morphostenophanes Pic, 1925  (the Palearctic and Indomalaya)
 Mrazius Pic, 1925  (the Neotropics)
 Mylaris Pallas, 1781  (the Neotropics)
 Nannalcyon Koch, 1950  (tropical Africa)
 Necrobioides Fairmaire, 1882  (Indomalaya)
 Neoplamius Löbl, Bouchard, Merkl & Bousquet, 2020  (Indomalaya)
 Neoporphyrhyba Ardoin, 1956  (tropical Africa)
 Neotheca Carter, 1930  (Australasia)
 Nesocyrtosoma Marcuzzi, 1976  (the Neotropics)
 Nesosphaerotus Gebien, 1921  (tropical Africa)
 Nodosogylium Pic, 1951  (tropical Africa)
 Nuptis Motschulsky, 1872  (the Neotropics)
 Oeatus Champion, 1885  (the Neotropics)
 Oectosis Pascoe, 1869  (Australasia)
 Oedemutes Pascoe, 1860  (Indomalaya)
 Oenomia Pascoe, 1883  (the Neotropics)
 Oenopion Champion, 1885  (North America and the Neotropics)
 Omolipus Pascoe, 1860  (Australasia)
 Oploptera Chevrolat, 1844  (the Neotropics)
 Osdara Walker, 1858  (Indomalaya and Australasia)
 Osdaroides Kaszab, 1980  (Indomalaya)
 Osternus Fairmaire, 1895  (tropical Africa)
 Othryoneus Champion, 1886  (the Neotropics)
 Otoceromorphus Pic, 1915  (the Neotropics)
 Oxidates Champion, 1886  (the Neotropics)
 Ozaenimorphus Fairmaire, 1882  (tropical Africa)
 Ozotypus Pascoe, 1862  (Indomalaya)
 Pachylesthus Fairmaire, 1897  (Indomalaya)
 Papuamisolampus Kaszab, 1986  (Australasia)
 Paramisolampidius Merkl & Masumoto, 2020  (the Palearctic and Indomalaya)
 Parastrongylium Kaszab, 1977  (Australasia)
 Parimmedia Gebien, 1928  (the Neotropics)
 Paroeatus Gebien, 1928  (the Neotropics)
 Paulianaria Bouchard & Bousquet, 2021  (tropical Africa)
 Perichilus Quedenfeldt, 1885  (tropical Africa)
 Periphanodes Gebien, 1943  (Indomalaya)
 Pezomaia Kulzer, 1952  (Indomalaya)
 Pezophenus Gebien, 1921  (Australasia)
 Phaedis Pascoe, 1866  (Indomalaya)
 Phenus Gebien, 1921  (Australasia)
 Phyllechus Bouchard & Bousquet, 2021  (Indomalaya)
 Phymaeus Pascoe, 1883  (Indomalaya)
 Phymatosoma Laporte & Brullé, 1831  (Indomalaya)
 Picocamaria Masumoto, 1993  (Indomalaya)
 Pigeostrongylium Kaszab, 1984  (Indomalaya)
 Pigeus Gebien, 1919  (Indomalaya)
 Piloxys Fairmaire, 1895  (tropical Africa)
 Plamius Fairmaire, 1896  (the Palearctic and Indomalaya)
 Platycrepis Lacordaire, 1859  (Indomalaya)
 Platyesthus Mäklin, 1878  (the Neotropics)
 Poecilesthus Dejean, 1834  (the Neotropics)
 Poeciltoides Fairmaire, 1896  (tropical Africa)
 Polopinus Casey, 1924  (North America)
 Polposipus Solier, 1848  (tropical Africa)
 Polypleurus Eschscholtz, 1831  (North America)
 Ponapeida Kulzer, 1957  (Oceania)
 Porphyrhyba Fairmaire, 1877  (tropical Africa)
 Postandrosus Kulzer, 1951  (Indomalaya)
 Priocamaria Gebien, 1919  (the Neotropics)
 Promethis Pascoe, 1869  (the Palearctic, tropical Africa, Indomalaya, Australasia, and Oceania)
 Proscorus Fairmaire, 1901  (tropical Africa)
 Pseudabax Kraatz, 1880  (Indomalaya)
 Pseudamarsenes Ardoin, 1955  (tropical Africa)
 Pseudandrosus Kulzer, 1951  (Indomalaya)
 Pseudhadrus Kolbe, 1910  (tropical Africa)
 Pseudimmedia Kulzer, 1958  (the Neotropics)
 Pseudisopus Kulzer, 1957  (Oceania)
 Pseudoblapida Pic, 1917  (the Neotropics)
 Pseudocamaria Bates, 1879  (tropical Africa)
 Pseudochrysomela Pic, 1925  (Indomalaya)
 Pseudoderiles Gebien, 1928  (the Neotropics)
 Pseudogena Fairmaire, 1899  (tropical Africa)
 Pseudonautes Fairmaire, 1892  (the Palearctic and Indomalaya)
 Pseudoperichilus Pic, 1921  (tropical Africa)
 Pseudopigeus Kaszab, 1984  (Indomalaya)
 Pseudothryoneus Pic, 1921  (the Neotropics)
 Pseudotocerus Champion, 1888  (the Neotropics)
 Psilonesogena Bates, 1879  (tropical Africa)
 Psydocamaria Pic, 1923  (Indomalaya)
 Psydomorphus Pic, 1921  (Indomalaya)
 Psydus Pascoe, 1868  (Indomalaya)
 Rehumius Fairmaire, 1893  (Indomalaya)
 Rhopalobates Fairmaire, 1897  (Indomalaya)
 Rhophobas Motschulsky, 1872  (Indomalaya)
 Robustocamaria Pic, 1922  (Indomalaya)
 Sadanaria Ando & Ichiyanagi, 2009  (Indomalaya)
 Saitostrongylium Masumoto, 1996  (Indomalaya)
 Saziches Champion, 1886  (the Neotropics)
 Scotaeus Hope, 1834  (Indomalaya)
 Scotoderus Perroud & Montrouzier, 1865  (Australasia and Oceania)
 Scutopiloxys Pic, 1924  (tropical Africa)
 Simalura Gebien, 1914  (the Palearctic and Indomalaya)
 Sophrobates Fairmaire, 1889  (the Neotropics)
 Sphaerocaulus Fairmaire, 1869  (tropical Africa)
 Sphaeromatris Fairmaire, 1899  (tropical Africa)
 Sphaerotidius Kaszab, 1941  (Indomalaya)
 Sphaerotus W. Kirby, 1819  (the Neotropics)
 Spheneuphloeus Kaszab, 1941  (Indomalaya)
 Sphenolampidius Kaszab, 1941  (Indomalaya)
 Sphenosdara Kaszab, 1941  (Indomalaya)
 Spinepicalla Pic, 1921  (the Neotropics)
 Spinoderosphaerus Pic, 1922  (Indomalaya)
 Srilanka Kaszab, 1980  (Indomalaya)
 Steneucyrtus Fairmaire, 1896  (Indomalaya)
 Stenochinus Motschulsky, 1860  (the Palearctic, tropical Africa, and Indomalaya)
 Stenophanes Solsky, 1876  (the Palearctic)
 Stenothesilea Kulzer, 1951  (Indomalaya and Australasia)
 Sternomaia Kulzer, 1952  (Indomalaya)
 Sthenoboea Champion, 1885  (the Neotropics)
 Strepsius Fairmaire, 1896  (tropical Africa)
 Strongylacanthus Brèthes, 1925  (the Neotropics)
 Strongylium W. Kirby, 1819  (worldwide)
 Styphloeus Kaszab, 1941  (Indomalaya)
 Suarezius Fairmaire, 1895  (tropical Africa)
 Sulpiusoma Ferrer, 2006  (tropical Africa)
 Sundon Pic, 1923  (Indomalaya)
 Sycophantes Kirsch, 1866  (the Neotropics)
 Sycophantomorphus Pic, 1924  (the Neotropics)
 Tabarus Gebien, 1921  (Australasia)
 Taichius Ando, 1996  (Indomalaya)
 Taiwanomenephilus Masumoto, 1986  (Indomalaya)
 Talanus Jacquelin du Val, 1857  (the Neotropics)
 Tanchirus Fairmaire, 1897  (Indomalaya)
 Taphrosoma Kirsch, 1866  (the Neotropics)
 Taraxides C.O. Waterhouse, 1876  (tropical Africa)
 Tearchus Kraatz, 1880  (Indomalaya)
 Teles Mulsant & Godart, 1876  (the Palearctic)
 Telethrus Pascoe, 1882  (the Neotropics)
 Telleus Fairmaire, 1904  (the Neotropics)
 Temnoaphelus Ferrer, 1988  (tropical Africa)
 Temnophthalmus Gebien, 1921  (tropical Africa)
 Tenebriocamaria Pic, 1919  (the Neotropics)
 Tenebriopsis Gebien, 1928  (the Neotropics)
 Tenesis Duvivier, 1892  (tropical Africa)
 Tentyriopsis Gebien, 1928  (the Neotropics)
 Tetragonomenes Chevrolat, 1878  (the Palearctic, Indomalaya, and Australasia)
 Tetraphyllus Laporte & Brullé, 1831  (the Palearctic and Indomalaya)
 Thecacerus Lacordaire, 1859  (the Neotropics)
 Theresea Pic, 1917  (Indomalaya)
 Thesilea Haag-Rutenberg, 1878  (Indomalaya, Australasia, and Oceania)
 Thettea Bates, 1879  (tropical Africa)
 Thydemorphus Pic, 1918  (Indomalaya)
 Tonkinius Fairmaire, 1903  (Indomalaya)
 Toxocnema Fåhraeus, 1870  (tropical Africa)
 Trichodamatris Chatanay, 1915  (tropical Africa)
 Uenomisolampidius Masumoto, 1996  (Indomalaya)
 Uenostrongylium Masumoto, 1999  (Indomalaya)
 Upis Fabricius, 1792  (North America and the Palearctic)
 Xanthobates Gebien, 1928  (the Neotropics)
 Xantusiella Kaszab, 1941  (Indomalaya)
 Xenius Champion, 1886  (the Neotropics)
 Xylopinus Leconte, 1862  (North America)
 Zabroideus Fairmaire, 1894  (the Palearctic)
 Zophius Dejean, 1834  (tropical Africa)
 Zophophilus Fairmaire, 1881  (Indomalaya and Australasia)
 † Anthracohelops Haupt, 1950
 † Caryosoma Haupt, 1950
 † Eodromus Haupt, 1950
 † Mimohelops Haupt, 1950
 † Parakeleusticus Haupt, 1950
 † Pseudohelops Haupt, 1950
 † Pyrochalcaspis Haupt, 1950

References